RealSports Tennis is a tennis simulation video game developed and published by Atari, Inc. for the Atari 2600, Atari 5200 and Atari 8-bit family in 1983. It is part of the RealSports series of games.

Gameplay 

Before the game starts, players have to name their character, a first for an Atari 2600 game, and choose between one and two player mode and the two pre-set difficulty levels ("slow" and "fast").

In the game, one player with a blue shirt plays tennis against an AI enemie portrayed by a non-player character (NPC) with a red shirt. In the two-player mode, one player competes against another player local. Players can move vertically and horizontally on the map. With the one button on the Atari 2600 controller, players make the serve. Every further shot is automatic if the ball has physical contact with the player. For every ball that falls on the opposing playing field, players get 15 points which they can see at the top part of the screen. After they reached 30 points, they only get 10 points for each other ball. After 40 points, they won one round. The number of rounds won goes up to 6. After winning 6 rounds, a new pile is opened at the top part of the screen which again goes up to 6. The first player who won two piles of 6 rounds wins the game.

Development 
The 2600 version's programmer is unknown, while the 5200 and Atari 8-bit family versions were coded by W Sean Hennessy. Atari's Director of Software George Kiss assigned the project to Hennessey knowing that he's a tennis fan. He did the 5200 version first and then ported the game to the Atari 8-bit family of home computers later. The game was so well received that Hennessey could chose his next project, which was uncommon among new Atari employees.

The ball is larger in the NTSC version than the PAL version. The Atari 5200 version is slower than the Atari 2600 version.

Legacy
The intellectual property rights for the game passed to Hasbro Interactive and were subsequently bought by Infogrames in 2001, which was subsequently re-named Atari SA. In 2018 the game was re-released by AtGames on their Flashback portable platform.

See also

List of Atari 2600 games
List of Activision games: 1980–1999
Tennis, another tennis game, developed by Activision

References

External links 
RealSports Tennis on Atari Mania
RealSports Tennis on MobyGames

1983 video games
Atari 2600 games
Atari 5200 games
Atari 8-bit family games
Tennis video games
Video games developed in the United States